Nadège Beausson-Diagne (born 18 June 1972 in Paris) is a French actress, singer and columnist. She is mainly known for having played the police chief Sara Douala in the television series Plus belle la vie. She also appeared in successful films such as Podium by Yann Moix and Nothing to Declare [Rien à déclarer] by Dany Boon.

Career 
Beausson-Diagne made her first film appearance in 2004, playing one of Benoit Poelvooirde’s four “Bernadettes” in Podium. She continued acting, appearing in various feature films such as Agathe Cléry directed by Valérie Lemercier, with whom she would later work in Marie-Francine, and in Nothing to Declare by Dany Boon, who had previously directed her in Bienvenue chez les Ch'tis.

From 2010 to 2014, she played the role of Commissioner Sara Douala in the soap opera Plus belle la vie. When her departure from the show was announced, a petition was circulated by her fans demanding that she be kept on.

In 2014, the Bausson-Diagne decided to join the Pep's series where she played the role of Catherine Paillard, the director of Victor Hugo College. The same year, she became a columnist in the program Touche pas à mon poste! before leaving the program in 2016. She then joined Bruno de Stabenrath with whom she co-presented Faut pas pousser on the channel Numéro 23. 

In 2017, she appeared in the video for the single "On est là" by the rapper Féfé, playing the role of a concert manager. However, she continued her acting career, playing in Ôtez-moi d'un doute, a comedy that won an award at the Cannes Film Festival, and Brillantissime, Michèle Laroque's first film.

Theater

Filmography

Television
Since 2015, she has been a columnist on TV show Touche pas à mon poste!.

Activism 
In September 2018 she was invited to the Summer University of Feminism organized by Marlène Schiappa in Paris.

During the 2018 Cannes Film Festival, she walked the red carpet alongside fifteen other actresses to denounce the under-representation of black and mixed-race French women as well as racist clichés in French cinema. "Fortunately you have fine features", "Do you speak African?", "Too black to play the role of a Métis", "Not African enough for an African"; are comments Beausson-Diagne has heard throughout her life.

In March 2019, she revealed that she had been a victim of sexual assault: "I too have been sexually harassed and sexually assaulted on two film shoots in Africa. That was a very long time ago. The pain was swallowed up. Today I am ready to speak out to help liberate this word and recover my life". She is a member of the 50/50 collective which aims to promote gender equality and the diversity in the cinema and audiovisual sector.

References

External links

1972 births
Living people
20th-century French actresses
21st-century French actresses
French film actresses
French television actresses
Actresses from Paris
French people of Senegalese descent